= Enzo L'Acqua =

Italian painter and ceramist

Enzo L'Acqua is an Italian painter and ceramist born in Savona in 1938. The gallery "El Temple" exhibited L'Acqua's together with Juan Segura's works in 2007.
